Fredrik Thulin (born 14 November 1972) is a Swedish freestyle skier. He competed in the men's moguls event at the 1994 Winter Olympics.

References

External links
 

1972 births
Living people
Swedish male freestyle skiers
Olympic freestyle skiers of Sweden
Freestyle skiers at the 1994 Winter Olympics
People from Åre Municipality
Sportspeople from Jämtland County
20th-century Swedish people